Southern Albemarle Rural Historic District is a national historic district located near Charlottesville, Albemarle County, Virginia.  The district encompasses 1,284 contributing buildings, 96 contributing sites, 486 contributing structures, and 3 contributing objects.  It includes a variety of large farms, historic villages, and crossroads communities. The district includes 23 properties previously listed on the National Register of Historic Places.

It was added to the National Register of Historic Places in 2007.

References

Historic districts in Albemarle County, Virginia
National Register of Historic Places in Albemarle County, Virginia
Historic districts on the National Register of Historic Places in Virginia